77 may refer to:

 77 (number)
 one of the years 77 BC, AD 77, 1977, 2077

Music
 77 (band), a Spanish hard rock band
 77 (Matt Kennon album)
 Talking Heads: 77, debut album by Talking Heads
 77 (Nude Beach album), an album by the band Nude Beach

See also
 '77 (disambiguation)
 7/7, the 7 July 2005 London bombings
 
 List of highways numbered